Scybalistodes vermiculalis is a moth in the family Crambidae. It is found in North America, where it has been recorded from Arizona.

The wingspan is about 17 mm. Adults have been recorded on wing from April to May and from August to September.

References

Moths described in 1964
Glaphyriinae